Shahiduzzaman Beltu is a Bangladesh Nationalist Party politician and the former Member of Parliament of Jhenaidah-4.

Career
Beltu was elected to parliament from Jhenaidah-4 as a Bangladesh Nationalist Party candidate in 1991, 1996, and 2001. In 2005, he headed a subcommittee of the Parliamentary standing committee on LGRD ministry affairs, that investigated former acting chief engineer Fariduddin Ahmed of Department of Public Health Engineering. In 2008, he was expelled from Bangladesh Nationalist Party.

References

External links 

 List of 5th Parliament Members -Jatiya Sangsad (In Bangla)
 List of 6th Parliament Members -Jatiya Sangsad (In Bangla)
 List of 7th Parliament Members -Jatiya Sangsad (In Bangla)
 List of 8th Parliament Members -Jatiya Sangsad (In Bangla)

Living people
People from Jhenaidah District
Bangladesh Nationalist Party politicians
5th Jatiya Sangsad members
6th Jatiya Sangsad members
7th Jatiya Sangsad members
8th Jatiya Sangsad members
Year of birth missing (living people)